The Social Democratic Movement (MDS), often shortened to just the Democrats, is a centre-right political party in Bolivia founded in 2013 for the movement for greater autonomy for the eastern departments of the Media Luna.

History 
Ruben Costas, governor of Santa Cruz department, announced the party's formation in March 2013. Twenty leaders gathered to launch the party in April 2013, including Costas, Beni governor Carmelo Lens and his predecessor Ernesto Suarez, Senator Bernard Gutierrez (PPB-Cochabamba), and Cochabamba council member Ninoska Lazarte. The launch was hosted by Savina Cuéllar, the former prefect of Chuquisaca Department, who as of April 2013, was under house arrest facing charges for the 24 May 2008, violence in Sucre.

After a failed petition to legally merge the registration of Costas' Truth and Social Democracy (VERDES) party, Renewing Freedom and Democracy (Libertad y Democracia Renovadora; Líder), and Popular Consensus in June, the Supreme Electoral Tribunal authorized Popular Consensus to rename itself the Social Democratic Movement in August 2013.

MDS participated in the 2014 election in alliance with the National Unity Front (UN), supporting the presidential candidacy of Samuel Doria Medina, electing 4 Deputies and one senator.

For the 2019 election, MDS and UN again joined to form the Bolivia Says No alliance, nominating Senator Óscar Ortiz as its presidential candidate. Within two weeks, the two parties split over internal disagreements, with MDS moving forward as the alliance's sole leader.

Party member and opposition Senator Jeanine Áñez became interim president of Bolivia in November 2019, following protests caused by alleged electoral fraud which led to the resignation of the government of Evo Morales. This move was contested by senators for the Movement for Socialism (MAS), Morales' party, who were majority in the assembly and were not in attendance, and thus stated that the vote for interim president took place without a quorum. However, the decision was upheld by the Plurinational Constitutional Court, which stated that it followed the succession mechanism stated in the Constitution of Bolivia.

Nevertheless, MAS maintains that Áñez's assumption to the presidency amounted to a coup d'état and in 2021 she was arrested under various charges relating to her assumption to the presidency.

References

2013 establishments in Bolivia
Conservative liberal parties
Conservative parties in Bolivia
Federalist parties
Liberal parties in Bolivia
Political parties established in 2013
Political parties in Bolivia
Regionalist parties